Beiwen Zhang (born 12 July 1990) is a Chinese-born American badminton player who is a singles specialist.

Career 
Zhang was born in China and moved to Singapore at the age of 13 in 2003 and played with the Singapore National Team until 2012. In 2007, Zhang took up Singapore citizenship. In 2011, her contract with the Singapore Badminton Association (SBA) was not renewed reportedly falling out with then-singles head coach Luan Ching.

In 2009, she was part of the Singapore national badminton team, winning a bronze medal at the women's team event of the 2009 Southeast Asian Games.  After a one-year break in which she did not play any tournaments at all, in 2013, she came back on her way to reach top level again. 

In 2013, after moving to Las Vegas with her parents, Zhang Beiwen won four international challenge tournaments with singles titles at the Swiss International in Yverdon-les-Bains; the Yonex USA International in Orlando, Florida; the Yonex Welsh International in Cardiff; and the Carlton Irish Open International in Dublin. In 2014, she continued her winning streak for her new country the US, with victories in Peru, the US, Brazil and the Netherlands. She won her first Grand Prix title at the 2014 U.S. Open Grand Prix Gold, then won the 2014 Brazil Open Grand Prix and 2014 Dutch Open Grand Prix.

In 2014, Zhange competed in the Singapore Open and was asked by the SBA to rejoin Singapore national team.

In 2016, Zhang started to compete in the Danish Badminton League, for Vendsyssel Elite Badminton. As of the 2019 season, she still plays for Vendsyssel. In 2016, she reached the final round at a BWF Super Series event, the French Open, for the first time, but finished as the runner-up after losing the final to He Bingjiao of China in straight games. In 2018, she won her first BWF World Tour title at the India Open, defeating host player and defending champion P. V. Sindhu with the score 21–18, 11–21, 22–20 in the final.

In 2021, Zhang competed in her first Pan Am Championships and clinched the women's singles title after beating Rachel Chan of Canada in straight games. On March the same year, she became a naturalised U.S. citizen. She then competed in the 2020 Summer Olympics. Her bid for a medal was cut short, however, when she suffered an apparent Achilles injury during a match against He Bingjiao of China in the Round of 16.

Achievements

Pan American Championships 
Women's singles

BWF World Tour (1 title, 2 runner-up) 
The BWF World Tour, which was announced on 19 March 2017 and implemented in 2018, is a series of elite badminton tournaments sanctioned by the Badminton World Federation (BWF). The BWF World Tours are divided into levels of World Tour Finals, Super 1000, Super 750, Super 500, Super 300 (part of the HSBC World Tour), and the BWF Tour Super 100.

Women's singles

BWF Superseries (1 runner-up) 
The BWF Superseries, which was launched on 14 December 2006 and implemented in 2007, was a series of elite badminton tournaments, sanctioned by the Badminton World Federation (BWF). BWF Superseries levels were Superseries and Superseries Premier. A season of Superseries consisted of twelve tournaments around the world that had been introduced since 2011. Successful players were invited to the Superseries Finals, which were held at the end of each year.

Women's singles

  BWF Superseries Finals tournament
  BWF Superseries Premier tournament
  BWF Superseries tournament

BWF Grand Prix (7 title, 2 runner-up) 
The BWF Grand Prix had two levels, the Grand Prix and Grand Prix Gold. It was a series of badminton tournaments sanctioned by the Badminton World Federation (BWF) and played between 2007 and 2017.

Women's singles

  BWF Grand Prix Gold tournament
  BWF Grand Prix tournament

BWF International Challenge/Series (9 title, 2 runner-up) 
Women's singles

Women's doubles

  BWF International Challenge tournament
  BWF International Series tournament
  BWF Future Series tournament

Record against selected opponents 
Record against Year-end Finals finalists, World Championships semi-finalists, and Olympic quarter-finalists. Accurate as of 23 October 2022.

References

External links 

 

1990 births
Living people
Sportspeople from Anshan
Badminton players from Liaoning
Chinese emigrants to Singapore
Singaporean female badminton players
Competitors at the 2009 Southeast Asian Games
Southeast Asian Games bronze medalists for Singapore
Southeast Asian Games medalists in badminton
People's Republic of China emigrants to the United States
Sportspeople from Las Vegas
American female badminton players
Badminton players at the 2020 Summer Olympics
Olympic badminton players of the United States
21st-century American women
Singaporean emigrants to the United States
People with acquired American citizenship